Patrick Benguigui (born 14 May 1959), better known by his stage name Patrick Bruel, is a French singer-songwriter, actor and professional poker player.

Biography

Early life 
Patrick is the son of Pierre Benguigui and Augusta Kammoun, daughter of Elie and Céline ben Sidoun. In his youth, Bruel aspired to be a football player, but decided instead to pursue singing after seeing Michel Sardou in 1975.

Acting and music careers 
His first success came as an actor, in 1979's Le Coup de sirocco. He continued acting in films, on television, and in the theater while pursuing his singing career. His first single, "Vide" ("Empty"), released in 1982, was not a success, but the follow-up, "Marre de cette nana-là" ("Fed up with that chick"), was a hit.

In 2003, just before his partner, the writer and playwright Amanda Sthers, gave birth to his first child, Oscar, on 19 August, he changed his name to Bruel-Benguigui, combining his stage name with his birth name. On 21 September 2004, he wed the then 26-year-old Sthers; it was his first marriage. His second child, Léon, was born on 28 September 2005. The couple separated in 2007.

As of 2004, Bruel has acted in more than forty television and film productions, and has made five studio albums and several live albums. In 2002, Bruel released Entre Deux, a double CD of classic chanson that features duets with Charles Aznavour, Jean-Louis Aubert, Jean-Jacques Goldman, Alain Souchon and Renaud, among others. It sold two million copies and made Bruel France's best paid singer of the year. At the beginning of 2005, in response to the South Asian tsunami of 26 December 2004, Bruel wrote the song "Et puis la terre" with Marie-Florence Gros, with whom he had begun a long-term collaboration in 1998, to benefit the Red Cross. His latest album, "Des souvenirs devant", was his fourth chart-topper in France.

Poker 
Bruel is a world-class professional poker player. He won a World Series of Poker bracelet in 1998 for the $5,000 Limit Hold'em event. As of 2009, he has earned more than $900,000 in tournament play, of which his ten cash winnings at the WSOP account for $411,659. He also comments on the World Poker Tour in France.

World Series of Poker bracelet

Philanthropy
Bruel has been a member of the Les Enfoirés charity ensemble since 1993.

Selected filmography

Le coup de sirocco (1979) - Paulo Narboni
Un pas dans la forêt (1980, TV Movie) - Pierre
La mort en sautoir (1980, TV Movie) - Un 'loubard'
Le Rembrandt de Verrières (1981, TV Movie)
Les enquêtes du commissaire Maigret (1981, TV Series) - Louis
Ma femme s'appelle reviens (1982) - François
Paris-Saint-Lazare (1982, TV Mini-Series) - Un lycéen
Les diplômés du dernier rang (1982) - Philippe
Le bâtard (1983) - Dan
Le grand carnaval (1983) - Pierre-Marie Labrouche
Les malheurs de Malou (1984, TV Movie) - José
Marche à l'ombre (1984) - Le guitariste du métro (uncredited)
La tête dans le sac (1984) - Dany
Les amours des années 50 (1985, TV Series)
Le mariage blues (1985, TV Movie) - Michel
Profs (1985) - Frédéric Game
Suivez mon regard (1986) - Le musicien
Attention bandits! (1986) - Mozart
La maison assassinée (1988) - Séraphin Monge
Champagne amer (1989) - Wanis
 (1989) - Simon Atlan - un inspecteur de police juif impulsif et violent
Force majeure (1989) - Philippe
Il y a des jours... et des lunes (1990) - The musician who missed his plane
Toutes peines confondues (1992) - Christophe / detective
Profil bas (1993) - Inspector Julien Segal
A Hundred and One Nights (1995) - Le premier orateur
Sabrina (1995) - Louis
Le Jaguar (1996) - François Perrin
K (1997) - L'inspecteur de police Sam Bellamy
Paparazzi (1998) - Patrick Bruel
The Misadventures of Margaret (1998) - Martin
Hors jeu (1998) - Patrick Bruel
Lost & Found (1999) - Rene
Le marquis (2000, Short) - Le marquis
Pretty Things (2001) - Jacques
The Milk of Human Kindness (2001) - Laurent
Une vie à t'attendre (2004) - Alex
The Wolf (2004) - Nelson
Comedy of Power (2006) - Jacques Sibaud
O Jerusalem (2006) - David Levin
A Secret (2007) - Maxime Nathan Grinberg / Grimbert
Change of Plans (2009) - Le docteur Alain Carcassonne
Desperate Parents (2009)
Comme les cinq doigts de la main (2010) - Dan Hayoun
The Writer (2011)
Paris Manhattan (2012) - Victor
What's in a Name? (2012) - Vincent
Les gamins (2013) - Le sosie de Patrick Bruel
Les Yeux jaunes des crocodiles (2014) - Philippe Dupin
The Missionaries (2014) - Lambert Levallois
Love at First Child (2015) - Ange
Un sac de billes (2017) - Roman Joffo
Holy Lands (2017) - Michel
A Family (2017) - Vincenzo / Husband
Le meilleur reste à venir (2019) - César
Villa Caprice (2020) - Gilles Fontaine

Discography

Albums

Studio albums

Live albums

Compilations

Singles

Featured in and collective collaborations

References

External links 

 
 
 Biography of Patrick Bruel, from Radio France Internationale
 Photos

1959 births
Living people
People from Tlemcen
Musicians from Paris
French male singers
World Music Awards winners
French poker players
World Series of Poker bracelet winners
Poker commentators
Migrants from French Algeria to France
Lycée Henri-IV alumni
French people of Algerian-Jewish descent
Knights of the Ordre national du Mérite
20th-century French male actors
21st-century French male actors
French male film actors
French male television actors
French male stage actors